Barren Township, Arkansas may refer to:

 Barren Township, Independence County, Arkansas
 Barren Township, Jackson County, Arkansas

See also 
 List of townships in Arkansas
 Barren Township (disambiguation)

Arkansas township disambiguation pages